Strict Joy is the second and final album by The Swell Season (Glen Hansard and Markéta Irglová). It was released in Ireland on October 23, 2009, the rest of Europe on October 26, and on October 27 in North America on the Anti- record label. The title of the album was derived from a 1931 book of poems written by Irish poet James Stephens.

The album reached number 15 on the Billboard 200.

Promotion
"In These Arms", the first single from the album was released on iTunes on August 18, 2009 and began streaming on spinner.com during the same week.

The Swell Season performed six of the new songs on NPR's Tiny Desk Concert on the August 10th show.

Track listing
"Low Rising" (Glen Hansard) – 3:59
"Feeling the Pull" (Glen Hansard) – 2:20
"In These Arms" (Glen Hansard) – 3:33
"The Rain" (Glen Hansard) – 3:40
"Fantasy Man" (Glen Hansard, Markéta Irglová) – 5:04
"Paper Cup" (Glen Hansard) – 3:21
"High Horses" (Glen Hansard) – 5:00
"The Verb" (Glen Hansard) – 4:32
"I Have Loved You Wrong" (Markéta Irglová) – 5:04
"Love That Conquers" (Glen Hansard) – 3:56
"Two Tongues" (Glen Hansard) – 3:44
"Back Broke" (Glen Hansard) – 4:03
"Somebody Good" (Japan and Korea bonus track)
"When Your Mind's Made Up" (Live) (Brazil bonus track)
"Falling Slowly" (Live) (Brazil bonus track)
"Lies" (Live) (Brazil bonus track)

Special edition live disc
 "All the Way Down"
 "Lies"
 "This Low"
 "Drown Out"
 "When Your Mind's Made Up"
 "I Have Loved You Wrong"
 "Falling Slowly"
 "Leave"
 "What Happens When the Heart Just Stops"
 "Lay Me Down"
 "Once"
 "If You Want Me"
 "Broken Hearted Hoover Fixer Sucker Guy"
 "Fitzcarraldo"

Special edition DVD (One Step Away - Live from the Riverside Theater, Milwaukee, WI. May 8, 2008)
 "Say It to Me Now"
 "All the Way Down"
 "When Your Mind's Made Up"
 "Lay Me Down"
 "Falling Slowly"
 "Gigantic" (Pixies cover)
 "Loved You Wrong"
 "Fitzcarraldo"
 "Once"

Personnel

Musicians
Glen Hansard – vocal, guitar
Markéta Irglová – piano, vocal
Colm Mac Con Iomaire – violin
Rob Bochnik – guitar, mandolin
Joe Doyle – bass guitar
Graham Hopkins – drums
Thomas Bartlett – piano, keyboards
Steven Bernstein – horns
Clark Gayton – horns
Chris Lightcap – bass
Chad Taylor – drums
Javier Mas – guitar

Charts

References

External links
theswellseason.com
The Swell Season MySpace Blog

The Swell Season albums
2009 albums